Bad Azz is the third studio album by American rapper Lil Boosie. It was released on October 24, 2006, by Trill Entertainment, Asylum Records and Warner Bros. Records. The album debuted at number 18 on the US Billboard 200, selling 41,000 copies in the first week.

Singles
The album's lead single, titled "Zoom", was released on September 29, 2006. The song features guest vocals from American southern hip hop rapper Yung Joc, while it is produced by Mouse.

Track listing

Charts

Weekly charts

Year-end charts

References

2006 albums
Lil Boosie albums
Asylum Records albums
Warner Records albums
Albums produced by Happy Perez